Myrtle McAteer (June 12, 1878 – October 26, 1952) was an American tennis player around the turn of the 20th century.

At the U.S. National Championships (now known as the U.S. Open), McAteer won the singles title in 1900, and doubles titles in 1899 and 1901. She also was a singles finalist in 1901, a doubles finalist in 1900, and a mixed doubles finalist in 1901.

She was also the first singles champion of the storied event in Cincinnati. She knocked off future International Tennis Hall of Famer Juliette Atkinson in the singles final in 1899 to take the title. In all, she reached 10 finals in Cincinnati, and in addition to her singles title in 1899 she won singles titles in 1900 and 1904, and doubles titles in 1899, 1900, 1904 & 1905. Her other finalist appearances came in singles in 1903 and 1905, and in doubles in 1903.

At the U.S. Clay Court Championships in 1915, she was a singles quarterfinalist and a mixed doubles semifinalist.

She died in Los Angeles, California in 1952.

Grand Slam finals

Singles (1 title)

Doubles (2 titles)

Mixed doubles (1 runner-up)

References
Modern Encyclopedia of Tennis, By Bud Collins
From Club Court to Center Court, The Evolution of Professional Tennis in Cincinnati by Phillip S. Smith (2008 Edition)
Spalding Lawn Tennis Annual, 1916
www.ancestry.com (Her death certificate from the California Death Index says "June 1878").
Cincinnati Enquirer

American female tennis players
Tennis players from Pittsburgh
United States National champions (tennis)
1878 births
1952 deaths
Grand Slam (tennis) champions in women's singles
Grand Slam (tennis) champions in women's doubles